Colonel Frank Allen Kurtz Jr. (September 9, 1911 – October 31, 1996) was an American Olympic diver and an aviator in the United States Army Air Forces.

Life and career
Kurtz was born in Davenport, Iowa, the third child of Dora Lee (née Fenton) and Frank Allen Kurtz, Sr., an insurance salesman. He grew up in Kansas City, Missouri. Kurtz became interested in flying at age 16, and in 1935 flew an open cockpit plane, setting a speed record flight from Los Angeles to Mexico City to Washington, D.C. and back to Los Angeles.

Kurtz's diving abilities impressed Olympic champion swimmer Johnny Weissmuller, who encouraged him to train with famous coach Clyde Swendsen. Kurtz graduated from Hollywood High School and went on to the University of Southern California especially to join the diving team. He won a bronze medal in the 10 meter platform at the 1932 Olympics and placed fifth in 1936, competing with an injured shoulder. He also won the AAU platform title in 1933.

Military career
Kurtz joined the Army to train as a pilot, anticipating a career in commercial aviation. Before the war, he held the national junior transcontinental speed record and established half a dozen other speed marks for light planes.

He was Commander of the 463d Bombardment Group (Heavy), 15th Air Force, Celone Airfield, Foggia, Italy (1944–45) and a survivor of the air attack at Clark Field in the Philippines, two days after the Japanese attack on Pearl Harbor on December 7, 1941. In Australia, he salvaged and helped to rebuild a B-17D Flying Fortress bomber using a combination of parts from other wrecked B-17s. At that time, the repaired B-17D was nicknamed "The Swoose" by 19th Bomb Group pilot, Captain Weldon Smith. The tail of a Boeing B-17D, AAF Ser. No. 40-3091 was grafted onto 40-3097, resulting in a hybrid B-17D. The bomber became "half swan and half goose" just like the lyrics in the then-popular novelty song "Alexander, The Swoose." Before the end of the war, "The Swoose" was scheduled to be scrapped and melted down for its aluminium content. Kurtz then convinced the City of Los Angeles to retrieve his by-then famous bomber for use as a World War II memorial: It was the only B-17 that flew from the beginning of World War II until the end. Today, "The Swoose" is the oldest surviving B-17 and the only early "D" model still in existence. It is located at the National Museum of the United States Air Force at Wright-Patterson Air Force Base in Fairborn, Ohio, for restoration work to enable future display.

After 24 years in the service of the United States Armed Forces (U.S. Army Air Corps, U.S. Army Air Forces, and the U.S. Air Force), Kurtz retired and became a top executive at the William May Garland development firm.

Personal life
Kurtz married Margret "Margo" Kurtz and had one child, actress Swoosie Kurtz (born 1944). His daughters first name "Swoosie" (rhymes with Lucy, rather than woozy) is derived from his two B-17s named "The Swoose" and "Swoose II", which he piloted with the 19th and 463rd Bomb Groups.

Kurtz died in 1996 from complications following a fall. In 2012, he was inducted into the International Swimming Hall of Fame.

See also
 List of members of the International Swimming Hall of Fame
 List of University of Southern California people

References

1911 births
1996 deaths
American people of German descent
USC Trojans men's swimmers
Divers at the 1932 Summer Olympics
Divers at the 1936 Summer Olympics
Olympic bronze medalists for the United States in diving
United States Army Air Forces pilots of World War II
Recipients of the Silver Star
Recipients of the Distinguished Flying Cross (United States)
American male divers
Deaths from falls
Medalists at the 1932 Summer Olympics
United States Army Air Forces officers
United States Air Force colonels